The Girl's Suite and The Perfume Suite is an album by American pianist, composer and bandleader Duke Ellington compiling recordings from 1957 and 1961 which were released on the Columbia label in 1982.

Re The Perfume Suite, as per Stanley Dance in the original album notes, "Originally premiered at Carnegie Hall on 19 December 1944, this four-part work was a deliberate attempt to dazzle a seated audience.  'The premise behind it,' Ellington wrote in Music Is My Mistress, 'was what perfume does to or for the woman who is wearing it, and each part portrayed the mood a woman gets into – or would like to get into – when wearing a certain type of perfume.'"

Reception

The AllMusic review by Scott Yanow stated, "Overall, this set is mostly  lesser Ellington pieces, but it is certainly not without its interesting moments."

Track listing
All compositions by Duke Ellington except where noted.
 "Girls" – 2:41 
 "Mahalia" – 3:12
 "Peg o' My Heart" (Fred Fisher, Alfred Bryan) – 2:59
 "Sweet Adeline" (Harry Armstrong) – 2:49
 "Juanita" – 3:18
 "Sylvia" – 2:41
 "Lena" – 2:13
 "Dinah" (Harry Akst, Sam M. Lewis, Joe Young) – 2:33
 "Clementine" (arranged Ellington) – 2:48
 "Diane" (Ernö Rapée, Lew Pollack) – 2:37
 "Under the Balcony" – 2:55
 "Strange Feeling" – 3:53
 "Dancers in Love" – 2:17
 "Coloratura" – 2:50

Recorded at Columbia 30th Street Studio, New York on December 2, 1957 (tracks 11 & 14) and December 9, 1957 (tracks 12 & 13) and at Columbia Studio, Los Angeles on September 19, 1961 (tracks 1–6) and September 20, 1961 (tracks 7–10)

Personnel
Duke Ellington – piano 
Cat Anderson, Shorty Baker (tracks 12 & 13), Willie Cook (tracks 1–11 & 14), Ed Mullens (tracks 1–10), Ray Nance, Clark Terry (tracks 11–14) – trumpet
Lou Blackburn (tracks 1–10), Lawrence Brown (tracks 1–10), Quentin Jackson (tracks 11–14), Britt Woodman (tracks 11–14) – trombone
John Sanders – valve trombone (tracks 11–14)
Chuck Connors – bass trombone (tracks 1–10) 
Jimmy Hamilton – clarinet, tenor saxophone
Johnny Hodges – alto saxophone
Russell Procope – alto saxophone, clarinet
Paul Gonsalves – tenor saxophone
Harry Carney – baritone saxophone, clarinet, bass clarinet
Aaron Bell (tracks 1–10), Jimmy Woode (tracks 1–14) – bass 
Sam Woodyard – drums
Milton Grayson – vocals (track 12)

References

Columbia Records albums
Duke Ellington albums
1982 albums
Albums produced by Irving Townsend
Albums produced by Teo Macero